Leptogium verrucosum is a rare species of foliose lichen in the family Collemataceae. Found in India, it was formally described as a new species in 2010 by Archana Dube and Urmila Vasudev Makhija. It has also been recorded growing on bark in moist shady locations. Characteristics of Leptogium patwardhanii include the numerous pycnidia that give the thallus a warty appearance, and the wrinkled upper and lower surfaces. Its ascospores are muriform (divided into internal chambers by a 1 or 2 vertical septa and 2 to 4 transverse septa), have acute ends, and measure 15–32 by 6–12 μm.

References

verrucosum
Lichen species
Lichens described in 2010
Lichens of India